Burk is a name.  Notable people with the name include:

Given name
Burk Uzzle (born 1938), American photojournalist

Surname
Adrian Burk (1927–2003), American football player
Amanda Burk, artist
Andrea Burk (born 1982), Canadian rugby footballer
Bryan Burk (born 1968), American film and television producer
Dean Burk (1904–1988), American biochemist, medical researcher, and cancer researcher
E. Michael Burk  (1847–1878), Irish soldier
Frederic Lister Burk (1862–1924), Canadian-born American educator, university president, and educational theorist
George A. Burk, United States Air Force captain, writer, and motivational speaker
Harvey William Burk (1822–1907), Canadian politician
Helmut Burk, recording engineer and producer
James Burk (born 1948), American sociologist and professor
Jeff Burk (born 1984), American author
John Daly Burk (c.1776–1808) Irish-born dramatist, historian and newspaperman 
Kathleen Burk (born 1946), professor
Mack Burk (born 1935), American baseball player
Martha Burk (born 1941), American political psychologist, feminist
Thomas Burk (1840–1926), American soldier
W. Herbert Burk (1867–1933), priest

See also
Burke, surname
Birk (name)
Berk (name)
Birks (surname)